Beringe (is a village in the Dutch province of Limburg. It is a part of the municipality of Peel en Maas, and lies about 15 km west of Venlo.

The village was first mentioned in 1447 as to Bieringen, and means "settlement of the people of Bero (person)".

The St Josef Church was built in 1928. On 15 November 1944, the tower was blown up and collapsed on the nave. The church was restored in 1951, and a new tower was built in 1952.

Beringe was home to 330 people in 1840.

References

Populated places in Limburg (Netherlands)
Peel en Maas